Simon Peter Wiles (born 22 April 1985) is an English football coach and former player who is first team coach at League Two club Salford City.

Career
Wiles signed for Blackpool in 2003 as a trainee. In October 2006, he joined Macclesfield Town under then manager, Paul Ince, on a month's loan, following teammate John Murphy who had also joined the club on loan a few days earlier. On 31 January 2007 his loan was extended until the end of the 2006–07 season.

After his loan spell expired he returned to Blackpool, but went out on loan to Macclesfield again on 17 July 2007, and he remained at Moss Rose until January 2008. In May 2008 he was offered a new contract by Blackpool.

In July 2008, Wiles had a trial at League Two club Morecambe, playing in two pre-season games, with manager Sammy McIlroy trying to arrange a deal with Blackpool. In August 2008 he moved to Scottish First Division side Dunfermline Athletic on a one-year contract but was later to suffer a serious knee injury which sidelined him for the rest of the season.

In January 2010, Wiles joined Conference team Barrow on non-contract terms. He later signed a contract in July 2010 after a successful pre-season campaign but suffered another serious knee injury in a match against Altrincham on 21 September 2010 which put him out of action for the rest of the 2010–11 season.

In June 2013, he became under-10s coach at Blackpool. Wiles signed for Chorley in 2013 after a successful trial and played a part in the club winning the Northern League Premier Division title.

Salford City
In the summer of 2014 he moved to Salford City. He made his club debut in the opening league match of the season on 16 August as Salford beat Scarborough 4–1. He left the club in early November 2014.

Bamber Bridge
On 4 November 2014 Simon signed for local rivals Bamber Bridge.

Honours
Barrow
FA Trophy: 2009–10

References

External links

Profile at dafc.co.uk

1985 births
Living people
English footballers
Association football midfielders
Blackpool F.C. players
Macclesfield Town F.C. players
Dunfermline Athletic F.C. players
English Football League players
Scottish Football League players
National League (English football) players
Blackpool F.C. non-playing staff
Salford City F.C. players
Chorley F.C. players
Barrow A.F.C. players
Northern Premier League players
Bamber Bridge F.C. players
Footballers from Preston, Lancashire
Fleetwood Town F.C. non-playing staff
English football managers
English Football League managers
Fleetwood Town F.C. managers